Ajoie may refer to:

Ajoie, a historic region roughly coinciding with Porrentruy District in northwestern Switzerland
249302 Ajoie, an asteroid
HC Ajoie, a Swiss professional ice hockey team